Primarily Evangelical Protestants represent 21% of the population. In Latin America most Protestants are called Evangelicos. There are different Protestant denominations that are active there mostly Evangelical, Pentecostal and Adventist and the Costa Rican Evangelical Presbyterian Church.

First Seventh-day Adventist missionaries arrived in 1903, and the Adventist church currently has  
55,680 members in that Central-American country.

References

 
Costa Rica